The Trunk Boiz are a rap group from Oakland, California and one of the first rap groups to attain commercial success from the burgeoning scraper bike scene of the Bay Area of California. They are widely considered to be the best pure lyricists in the rap industry. Their first hit, Scraper Bike, introduced mainstream America to scraper bikes, a distinct type of bicycle (inspired by the scraper car style) ridden in Oakland, California, specifically East Oakland, and became one of the earliest internet viral videos, with the YouTube video "Scraper Bike" racking up millions of views by September 2008. National Public Radio discussed the phenomenon on both Weekend Edition and California Report, stating that Scraper Bike "attracted a cult following," with the video having "spawned what is becoming a worldwide movement, even as it changed the lives of the young men who customized the bikes and made the video." The Trunk Boiz performed with Kehlani at her sold-out show at Fox Oakland Theatre in 2016.

Notes

Hip hop groups from California